Deewaar is a 1975 Indian Hindi-language action crime film  directed by Yash Chopra and written by Salim–Javed (Salim Khan and Javed Akhtar). It stars Shashi Kapoor, Amitabh Bachchan, Neetu Singh, Nirupa Roy and Parveen Babi. The film tells the story of a pair of impoverished brothers who, after their family is betrayed by the misplaced idealism of their father, struggle to survive in the slums of Bombay, and eventually find themselves on opposing sides of the law. The Deewaar ("wall") of the title is the wall that has sprung up between the two brothers, drawn apart by fate and circumstances in a time of socio-political turmoil.

Upon release, Deewaar was both critically and commercially successful, with praise going towards the film's screenplay, story, and music, as well as the performances of the acting ensemble, particularly Bachchan, Kapoor and Roy's performances. It is often considered a ground-breaking cinematic masterpiece, with Indiatimes ranking Deewaar amongst the Top 25 Must See Bollywood Films, as well as being one of three Hindi-language films to be included on the list of 1001 Movies You Must See Before You Die. The film had a significant impact on Indian cinema, as well as wider Indian society, with the film's anti-establishment themes and Bachchan's criminal anti-hero vigilante character resonating with audiences, cementing Bachchan's popular image as the "angry young man" of Bollywood cinema. Forbes included Bachchan's performance in the film on its list, "25 Greatest Acting Performances of Indian Cinema". The film also cemented the success of the writing duo Salim-Javed, who went on to write many more blockbuster films; the value of film writers skyrocketed thanks to Salim-Javed, who were paid as highly as leading actors at the time. Deewaars influence also extends to world cinema, influencing films from Hong Kong and British cinema.

Plot 
The film opens with a depiction of the strong leadership of trade unionist Anand Verma, who works hard to enhance the lives of struggling laborers. He lives in a modest home with his wife Sumitra Devi, and their two young sons Vijay and Ravi. However, things take a turn for the worse when Anand is blackmailed by a corrupt businessman who threatens to kill his family if Anand does not cease his protest activities. Forced into compliance, Anand is thus attacked by the very same laborers who jeer him for his betrayal, who are unaware that he was blackmailed to do so. His family is also persecuted by the angry workers. Out of shame, Anand leaves town, leaving Sumitra to care for their sons alone in poverty. Several of the angry workers kidnap Vijay and tattoo his arm with the Hindi words "मेरा बाप चोर है" (merā bāp chor hai; my father is a thief). Not knowing what else to do, Sumitra brings her children to Mumbai and struggles as a day laborer to care for her sons.

As the boys grow up to be young men, Vijay grows up with an acute awareness of his father's failure as he has been victimized for his father's supposed misdeeds. In the process of fighting for his rights, Vijay starts out as a boot polisher and later becomes a dockyard worker. When Vijay beats up several thugs working for the ruthless crime lord Samant, this influences one of Samant's rivals Mulk Raj Daavar to bring Vijay to his inner circle. When Vijay successfully completes a task in nabbing several of Samant's goods for Daavar, the latter rewards him with money, allowing Vijay to buy a palatial home for his family. While continuing on his assignments for Daavar, Vijay also sacrifices his own education so Ravi can study.

As Ravi finishes his studies, he starts dating Veera Narang, the daughter of Police Commissioner DCP Narang. On the Commissioner's suggestion, Ravi applies for employment with the police and is sent for training. Several months later, he is accepted by the police and earns the rank of Sub-Inspector. When Ravi returns home, his first assignment is to apprehend and arrest some of Bombay's hardcore criminals and smugglers, which includes his brother, Vijay – much to his shock, as he had never associated his own brother with criminal activities. Ravi must now decide between apprehending Vijay and quitting the police force. At first, Ravi is reluctant of arresting his brother, but he is later moved when he non-fatally shoots a boy who stole two rotis in an attempt to catch him. When a remorseful Ravi goes to the boy's family by giving them some food and confessing what he did, the mother berates Ravi while the boy's father sends her back to the room. The father forgives Ravi and justifies his action by saying that stealing of a 'lakh' or of food is the same, which finally motivates Ravi to agree to take the case.

When Ravi finds out that Vijay has acquired wealth by crime, he decides to move out along with Sumitra (who too is disgusted), causing a feud to develop between Vijay and Ravi. Around the same time, Anand is found dead inside a train, and his body is cremated by Vijay. Ravi then takes the opportunity to complete his task in taking down and arresting many associates from both Samant and Daavar's gangs; even Daavar himself ends up being arrested by Ravi. Fuming over the loss of his family and many of his associates, Vijay enters into a relationship with a woman named Anita, whom he meets at a bar. When Anita falls pregnant with Vijay's child, Vijay decides to abandon his life in the underworld so that he can marry her, confess his sins, and seek forgiveness from Sumitra and Ravi. However, Samant and his remaining goons arrive and murder Anita, provoking an enraged Vijay to brutally murder Samant and his remaining goons in revenge, leading himself to be branded a criminal forever.

Upon hearing about what happened following the deaths of Samant and his gang, Ravi meets with Vijay in a final clash, pleading him to stop running and surrender himself. Vijay refuses and ends up being fatally shot in the arm by Ravi while escaping to a temple where he reunites with Sumitra and pleads forgiveness. Vijay then dies in Sumitra's arms, leaving her extremely shattered. Around the same time, Ravi arrives to the temple and is completely distraught over what he has done to Vijay. The film ends with the police hosting a celebration for Ravi for his successful acts of pursuing justice and taking down the criminals, though Ravi is still wracked with remorse for killing Vijay.

Cast 

 Shashi Kapoor as Ravi Verma
 Raju Shrestha as Young Ravi Verma
 Amitabh Bachchan as Vijay Verma
Alankar Joshi as Young Vijay Verma
 Neetu Singh as Veera Narang
 Nirupa Roy as Sumitra Devi
 Parveen Babi as Anita
 Manmohan Krishna as DCP Narang
 Madan Puri as Samant
 Iftekhar as Mulk Raj Daavar
 Satyendra Kapoor as Anand Verma
 Sudhir as Jaichand
 Jagdish Raj as Jaggi
 Raj Kishore as Darpan
 Yunus Parvez as Rahim Chacha
 Rajan Verma as Lachhu
 D. K. Sapru as Mr. Agarwal

Additionally Vikas Anand, Mohan Sherry, Manik Irani  Kamal Kapoor, A. K. Hangal, Dulari, and Satyadev Dubey all appear in minor and cameo roles. In the song "Koi Mar Jaye", Aruna Irani appears as a guest dancer.

Production

Story and screenplay 
The film's screenplay, story and dialogues were written by Salim–Javed (Salim Khan and Javed Akhtar). The main inspiration for the film's plot was the 1961 Dilip Kumar film Gunga Jumna (1961), which had a similar premise of two brothers on opposing sides of the law, with the elder criminal brother as the main character.
The role of Amitabh Bachchan is partially based on Karna from the Mahabharata whereas Shashi Kapoor resembles Yudhisthira from the Mahabharata. Deewaar is thus considered to be a spiritual successor to Gunga Jumna. Salim-Javed credited Gunga Jumna as well as Mehboob Khan's Mother India (1957) as the main inspirations for Deewaar, which they described as a "more urban, much more contemporary" take on their themes; while Mother India and Gunga Jumna took place in a rural context, Salim–Javed reinterpreted their themes in a contemporary urban context with Deewaar.

Amitabh Bachchan's character, Vijay, was loosely inspired by the real-life Bombay underworld gangster Haji Mastan. Vijay's story arc in the film parallels that of Mastan's life, such as the rise from a humble dockyard coolie worker to a powerful smuggler, and Mastan's rivalry with smuggler Sukkur Narayan Bakhia is similar to Vijay's rivalry with Samant (Madan Puri).

Salim–Javed's screenplay had dynamic dialogues and incorporated a number of symbolic motifs. For example, the scene where the two brothers meet as adults takes place under a bridge, symbolizing a bridge forming between the brothers. Set in the Dharavi slums of Bombay, the film's story of gangsters in Dharavi was a critique of socio-political inequality and injustice in Bombay. The characterisations of the two brothers are sociologically contextualised to represent a form of urban conflict and drama, aimed at presenting a causal explanation for the sequence of events and Vijay's social alienation, with the narrative explaining his every action and decision, grounded in his memories and experiences.

The script generally has an atmosphere of secularism, while incorporating subtle religious motifs. The mother Sumitra Devi (Nirupa Roy) and police brother Ravi (Shashi Kapoor) are religious Hindus, whereas the criminal brother Vijay (Bachchan) is generally not religious and "upset with God", yet he carries a badge numbered 786, which the Muslim Rahim Chacha (Yunus Parvez) points out to be a number of religious significance in Islam (representing Bismillah) and has its own sub-plot. The 786 badge plays a powerful and symbolic role in several scenes, saving Vijay at key moments and signifying something ominous when he loses it.

Salim-Javed initially showed the script to Bachchan, who they had in mind for Vijay's role after having worked with him on Zanjeer (1973). At the time, Bachchan was working on another film with Yash Chopra, and told him about the script. After some initial scepticism, Chopra was eventually convinced to direct the film after Salim-Javed narrated the storyline to him.

Casting and filming 
Bachchan's "angry young man" performance as Vijay in the film was inspired by Dilip Kumar's intense performance as Gunga in Gunga Jumna, which Bachchan sharpened and reinterpreted in a contemporary urban context reflecting the changing socio-political climate of 1970s India.

Salim-Javed "felt only Bachchan could do justice to Vijay's role." According to Akhtar, they "saw his talent, which most makers didn't. He was exceptional, a genius actor who was in films that weren't good." At Salim-Javed's insistence, Bachchan was cast in the role. Director Yash Chopra's first choices for Vijay and Ravi's roles were Dev Anand and Rajesh Khanna respectively. After Anand rejected the script, casting plans changed and Khanna was to play Vijay and Navin Nischol was considered for Ravi. However, Salim-Javed had Amitabh Bachchan and Shatrughan Sinha in mind when they wrote the script; Sinha turned down the film when he heard Khanna was initially cast in the lead, due to a fallout between the two. Nirupa Roy's role as Sumitra Devi was also first offered to Vyjayanthimala; Nischol and Vyjayanthimala turned down the film after they found out Khanna would no longer be in the film. Shashi Kapoor was subsequently cast as Ravi, and Nirupa Roy as Sumitra Devi.

In 2014, Bachchan revealed that his iconic look in the film – a "denim blue shirt worn with khakee pants and a rope dangling over the shoulder" – was the result of a mistake by the tailor. He said, "The knotted shirt and rope on the shoulder in [Deewaar] was an adjustment for an error in stitching, shirt too long so knotted it". In certain scenes, Bachchan had some input on Chopra's direction, such as the father's funeral scene where Bachchan, instead of lighting the pyre with his right hand, suggests to use his left hand to show off the tattoo, "Mera baap chor hai" ("My father is a thief"). The film was shot mostly at night because Bachchan was shooting for Ramesh Sippy's Sholay at that time.

The film contains a fight scene, which involves Bachchan performing martial arts sequences inspired by Hong Kong martial arts cinema, which Deewaar was one of the first to do in Indian cinema. Rather than following the Hollywood model, it follows the Hong Kong model, with an emphasis on acrobatics and stunts. The style of fighting seen in Deewaar combined kung fu (as it was perceived by Indians) with Indian martial arts (particularly Indian wrestling).

Soundtrack 

The soundtrack of the movie was composed by R. D. Burman, and the lyrics were penned by Sahir Ludhianvi. The soundtrack received praise.

Impact and worldwide recognition

Inspiration 
The Hindu epic Mahabharata has been the sole inspiration for Akhtar to write the plot of the film, Amitabh Bachchan plays the role based on Karna (the main protagonist of the Mahabharata) who rises from the low streets to becoming among the top influential businessmen whereas the role of Nirupa Roy resembles Kunti (mother of Karna in the Mahabharata). Shashi Kapoor plays Arjuna (younger brother of Karna)

Cult 
It was one of the three Hindi films featured in the book 1001 Movies You Must See Before You Die, the others being Kalyug (1981) which itself was inspired by Mahabharata and Dilwale Dulhania Le Jayenge (1995).

Release

Release and sales 
At the Indian box office, the film grossed  ($9million). In Bombay alone, the film grossed .

Numerous DVD editions entered the market by companies like "Eros Entertainment", "Shemaroo Entertainment" and "Eagle Home Video". These were released as non-restored, non re-mastered editions and bare bones, void of supplementary features. Eagle Home Video came out with a restored edition of this movie, preserving the original aspect ratio in a 4:3 pillar box and a DTS Master Audio (HD) in 2.0. The restoration took place in Shemaroo studios.

Critical response and international impact 

Upon release, Deewaar was a major commercial success, ranking as the fourth highest-grossing Bollywood film of 1975, and received critical acclaim, with critics praising the story, dialogue, screenplay, as well as the performances of the cast, particularly those of Bachchan, Kapoor and Roy. Indiatimes ranks Deewaar amongst the Top 25 Must See Bollywood Films. It was one of the three Hindi films featured in the book 1001 Movies You Must See Before You Die, the others being Mother India (1957) and Dilwale Dulhania Le Jayenge (1995).

It was perceived by audiences to be anti-establishment, while Amitabh Bachchan's character Vijay was seen as a vigilante angry hero, establishing Bachchan's image as the "angry young man" of Indian cinema. With the unprecedented growth of slums across India at the time, Vijay was seen as a new kind of hero, with his suppressed rage giving a voice to the angst of the urban poor. Deewaar is also remembered for its iconic dialogues written by Salim-Javed. The most famous is when Shashi Kapoor delivers the line, "Mere paas maa hai" ("I have mother"), a line that is widely known in India and has become part of Indian popular culture. The film Loins of Punjab Presents (2007) mocked how the line is sometimes wrongly attributed to Amitabh Bachchan. It also established Parveen Babi as the "new Bollywood woman".

The film cemented the success of the writing duo Salim-Javed, who went on to write many more blockbuster films. After the success of this film, the value of film writers skyrocketed thanks to Salim-Javed, and they soon were being paid as highly as some actors at the time. Amitabh Bachchan described Salim-Javed's screenplay for Deewaar as "the perfect script" and "the best screenplay ever" in Indian cinema. Deewaar, one of the first Indian films with an action sequence modelled after Hong Kong martial arts cinema, popularised the use of martial arts sequences in Bollywood films from the 1970s to the 1990s. The style of fighting popularised by Deewaar, with acrobatics and stunts, and combining Chinese kung fu (as it was perceived by Indians, based on 1970s Hong Kong films) with Indian pehlwani wrestling, became the standard model for Bollywood action scenes up until the 1990s.

The film was later remade in Telugu as Magaadu (1976), in Tamil as Thee (1981), in Malayalam as Nathi Muthal Nathi Vare (1983), in Persian as Koose-ye Jonoob (1978), and in Turkish as Acıların Çocuğu (1985). The Brothers, a 1979 Hong Kong film produced by the Shaw Brothers Studio, is a remake of this film. Another remake of Deewaar was the 1994 Bollywood film Aatish: Feel the Fire, starring Sanjay Dutt as the older criminal brother, Atul Agnihotri as the younger police brother, and Tanuja as the mother. Hong Kong's Shaw Brothers studio remade Deewaar as The Brothers (1979), which in turn inspired John Woo's internationally acclaimed breakthrough A Better Tomorrow (1986). The Brothers also starred a Hong Kong actor that would later be known for heroic bloodshed films, Danny Lee (playing Shashi Kapoor's character), with a police officer persona later seen in Hong Kong crime films such as Woo's The Killer (1989).

Deewaar had an influence on Hong Kong cinema and in turn Hollywood cinema, by playing a key role in the creation of the heroic bloodshed crime genre of 1980s Hong Kong action cinema. Deewaar, along with several later 1970s "angry young man" epics it inspired, such as Amar Akbar Anthony (1977), had similarities to elements later seen in 1980s Hong Kong heroic bloodshed films.

British director Danny Boyle described Deewaar as being "absolutely key to Indian cinema" and cited the film as an influence on his Academy Award winning film Slumdog Millionaire (2008). The film's co-director Loveleen Tandan noted that "Simon Beaufoy studied Salim-Javed's kind of cinema minutely." Actor Anil Kapoor noted that some scenes of Slumdog Millionaire "are like Deewaar, the story of two brothers of whom one is completely after money while the younger one is honest and not interested in money." Slumdog Millionaire, which pays homage to Amitabh Bachchan, has a similar narrative structure to Deewaar. Composer A. R. Rahman referenced the film in his Oscar acceptance speech.

Awards and nominations 
Deewaar received the Filmfare Best Movie Award of 1976, and also won six more Filmfare Awards for Best Screenplay, Best Dialogue, Best Director, Best Sound, Best Story, and Best Supporting Actor (Kapoor), and received two other nominations for Best Actor (Bachchan) and Best Supporting Actress (Roy).

Further reading 
 Dwyer, Rachel. "Amitabh Bachchan: the Angry Young Man." British Academy of Film and Television Arts, 16 November 2007.
 Lal, Vinay. "Deewaar (The Wall)."  Revised excerpt from The Secret Politics of Our Desires: Innocence, Culpability, and Indian Popular Cinema, ed. Ashish Nandy. London: Zed Press and Delhi: Oxford University Press, 1998, pp. 228–59
 Mazumdar, Ranjani. Bombay Cinema: An Archive of the City. Minneapolis: University of Minnesota Press, 2007.
 Virdi, Jyotika. "Deewaar: the fiction of film and the fact of politics." Jump Cut, No. 38, June 1993:26–32.

Notes

References

External links 

 

1970s action drama films
1970s crime action films
1970s Hindi-language films
1970s Urdu-language films
1975 crime drama films
1975 films
Fictional portrayals of the Maharashtra Police
Films about brothers
Films about organised crime in India
Films directed by Yash Chopra
Films scored by R. D. Burman
Films set in Mumbai
Films shot in Mumbai
Films with screenplays by Salim–Javed
Hindi films remade in other languages
Indian action drama films
Indian crime action films
Indian crime drama films
Trimurti Films
Urdu films remade in other languages
Urdu-language Indian films